Lisa Zane (born Elizabeth Frances Zane; April 5, 1961) is an American actress and singer.

Personal life
Zane was born in Chicago, Illinois, the daughter of Thalia and William George Zane Sr., founders of a medical technical school. Her family's original surname, "Zanetakos", was anglicized to "Zane" by her father. Both of her parents are of Greek descent. She is the older sister of actor Billy Zane.

Career
Zane's first film role was in the 1989 movie Heart of Dixie. She starred in Gross Anatomy the same year. Other early acting roles included Claire in Bad Influence (1990), counselor Maggie Burroughs in Freddy's Dead: The Final Nightmare (1991), the title role in The Nurse (1997) and a cameo as the gynaecologist in the comedy Cruel but Necessary (2005). She was a series regular as Melina Paros in L.A. Law from 1992 to 1993, JoAnne Meltzer in Profit, Diana in Roar, Le Sage in Dinotopia for Hallmark Entertainment and Sophia Keener in Law and Order in 2006. She provided the voice for She-Hulk in the first season of 1990s cartoon The Incredible Hulk, as well as Charley Davidson in Biker Mice from Mars in the follow-up 2006 series, taking over from Leeza Miller-McGee.

She has originated many roles on stage, playing Varya in David Mamet's debut adaptation of The Cherry Orchard at the Goodman Theatre,  Rita in Craig Lucas's Prelude to a Kiss and Cleo in Lyle Kessler's Robbers. Zane has also made many guest appearances on TV shows, including Lifestories: Families in Crisis, The Outer Limits, Judging Amy, and The Division.

Zane is a singer, BMI songwriter, and recording artist. In 2006, the Songwriters Hall of Fame recognized her as one of their new songwriters of the year.

She played the part of the "alter ego" in Amanda Eliasch's play "As I Like It" in 2012, and an award-winning documentary drama "The Gun the Cake and the Butterfly" (2014), in which she sang with Charles Eliasch.
The same year she performed in The Girl from Nagasaki a film by Michel Comte based on Madame Butterfly. In 2013, Zane performed in The Chateau Marmont in Los Angeles.

Filmography

Film

Television

References

External links

Lisa Zane official website

1961 births
Actresses from Chicago
American film actresses
American television actresses
American voice actresses
American people of Greek descent
Living people
American women singer-songwriters
American stage actresses
Singers from Chicago
Vassar College alumni
20th-century American actresses
21st-century American actresses
Singer-songwriters from Illinois

 Francis W. Parker School (Chicago) alumni